James Lowell (December 25, 1867 – May 8, 1914) was a Canadian politician. He served in the Legislative Assembly of New Brunswick from 1908 to 1912 as an Independent member.

References 

1867 births
1914 deaths